Qoşakənd (also, Koshakend and Narimankend) is a village and municipality in the Ismailli Rayon of Azerbaijan.  It has a population of 624.  The municipality consists of the villages of Qoşakənd, Tubikənd, and Kənzə. During the Soviet period, it was renamed in honor of Azeri revolutionary Nariman Narimanov.

References 

Populated places in Ismayilli District